The 2011 Women's European Trophy was the 16th rugby tournament organised by FIRA for the continent's national teams. The venues were in and around A Coruña in Spain, and the games have been played between 30 April and 7 May.

Following Jean-Claude Baqué's statement before the 2010 tournament regarding the aims of the European Trophy, all Six Nations teams were to be "A" teams, and their matches were therefore not "tests". However, though they were called "France A" the French team were their main squad, while Italy "A" teams included 17 of the 22 players from the squad that beat Scotland in the Six Nations a few weeks before. England "A" was also a stronger than normal selection - 11 players had full international caps, including six who had played in the 2011 Six Nations.

Some of the largest crowds ever to watch women's rugby in Spain attended the home team's games, rising from 1,500 for their opening fixture to a near capacity 2,500 for the final.

All games were 35 minutes each way.

Pool A

Results

Pool B

Results

7th place

5th place

3rd place

Final

See also
Women's international rugby union
Official website

Notes

External links
FIRA website
Tournament website (with squads, video and pictures)

2011
2011 rugby union tournaments for national teams
International women's rugby union competitions hosted by Spain
2010–11 in European women's rugby union
2011 in Spanish women's sport
Sport in A Coruña
2010–11 in Spanish rugby union